This is a list of the extreme points of Tajikistan.

Cardinal directions
The northernmost region is Sughd Region. The easternmost region is Gorno-Badakhshan Autonomous Region. The country shares a border (Tajikistan–Uzbekistan border) with Uzbekistan in the west and a border (Afghanistan–Tajikistan border)  with Afghanistan in the south.

Elevation

See also 

Geography of Tajikistan
Extreme points of Asia

Notes

References 

Geography of Tajikistan
Tajikistan